Corinne Migneco is a female former United States international table tennis player.

She won a silver medal at the 1936 World Table Tennis Championships in the Corbillon Cup (women's team event), with Ruth Aarons and Jessie Purves for the United States.

See also
 List of table tennis players
 List of World Table Tennis Championships medalists

References

American female table tennis players
Year of birth missing
Possibly living people
World Table Tennis Championships medalists
20th-century American women